Pierre Vidoue (c.1490–1543), 
Parisian printer and bookseller, active from 1516 to 1543;
in his Latin books he calls himself Petrus Vidouæus.
He was succeeded by his wife Jeanne Garreau in 1544 and 1545; she then married the bookseller Estienne des Hayes.

Vidoue succeeded Pierre Viart as one of the libraires jurés of the University of Paris in 1523; in 1524 he became one of the gouverneurs of the Parisian book trade's social and religious guild, the confrérie of St John the Evangelist.

Addresses 
His address and shop sign were at various dates:
  Au Petit pont, in intersignio Cathedræ (on the Petit Pont, at the sign of the Chair); 1516
  Rue Perdue près la place Maubert; 1519 and 1528
  Au mont Saint-Hilaire  / En la rue des Amandiers / Devant le collège de Reims; from 1531

Motto and devices

His motto was Par sit Fortuna Labori  (May good fortune be equal to my hard work).
Several of his printer's devices included the figure of Fortune.
They are illustrated in Renouard's Les Marques typographiques parisiennes des XVe et XVIe siècles:
 Renouard 1096
 Renouard 1097
 Renouard 1098

Other compartments and marks
 Renouard 1099
 Renouard 1100
 Renouard 1101

References 

French printers
1543 deaths
16th-century French people
Year of birth uncertain